Robert B Suda (A.k.a. Suda Balázs Róbert, born 16 June 1978) is a London-based theatre director, playwright and producer who has a BA and two MAs in cultural management (Janus Pannonius University of Pecs - 2000), theatre project management (University of Pecs 2002) and advanced theatre studies (Theatrology – University of Pannonia 2006). Since 1997, he has directed and produced numerous shows on stage, which have been highly acclaimed by both critics and audiences. He also has significant experience in producing for stage and for TV.
He was both educated in and employed Constantin Stanislavski's method of psychological realism Theatrical realism and the directing technique of Bertold Brecht Epic theatre. His works are also highly influenced by neo-expressionism, constructivism and minimalism. In his productions he has combined these techniques with elements of physical theatre, dance, pantomime and minimalist architectural set design both in prose and musical productions.
He worked in long-term artistic collaboration with Veronika Karsai pantomime artist and physical-theatre director. During their teamwork they developed and staged two productions (Cursed Cows, richard2nixon) establishing their own theatrical form of expression. Suda's another long-term collaborative artistic colleague was Attila Galambos with whom they not only have written mainstream musicals (That's Enough!, Covershow, Better Than Sex), but Galambos, as an actor, was a part of many of Suda's productions (The Dumb-waiter, Cursed Cows, Covershow, moNOporno).
In 2005, he was selected as one of the best young playwrights of the year by the Young Writers’ Association, Hungary, (FISz) for his play Cursed Cows, which he both wrote and directed. The script was published by the Association in 2006.

Theatre works

Director

Producer

Dramaturge

Critical reaction 
“With an impressive use of multimedia and a strong all-female cast delivering witty lines, Who Does She Think She Is? captures the fickleness of females and the trials we often face when trying to fit in.”

“...the show does have originality on its side and a big, beating heart thanks to an enthusiastic six-strong cast”
″Well, to be fair, it was quite entertaining.″
"The result is bold, madcap chaos, as if a GCSE history teacher, undergoing a nervous breakdown, was giving the final lesson of his life. Original, impossible to forget and almost too ridiculous to recommend, this is one of the most bamboozling nights we’ve ever spent at the theatre."

“Expect the unexpected, leave some prejudices behind and you'll have a rewarding eighty minutes.”
“...who make a trip here, could catch some twenty minutes of red-hot music, sectioned into lively mini-concerts, and in addition, will get a great minimal-drama without pomposity .”
“Julie’ll rock you!”
“The ending praises the prodigious talent of Robert B Suda. Even after the many twists and turns it surprises the audience, whose attention is not let to wander for a second.”

Awards 
While he was working on different stage productions, Mr Suda was a theatre columnist of Musical&Operetta magazine between2003 and 2005 where he published many articles and interviews regarding Hungarian and international musical productions. Mr Suda was commissioned by MUSICALITAS School for Musical and Drama (Budapest) to undertake the role of the drama, musical and theatre history teacher of school for a year term from 2008.

The Young Writers' Association(FISz) published his first collection of dramas in 2007 including the award-winner play Cursed Cows (ÁtkozottTehenek) and the highly successful political play, richard2nixon, co-written by Elod P Csirmaz for the Thalia Theatre, Budapest.

References 

1978 births
Living people
Hungarian theatre directors
Hungarian theatre managers and producers
Hungarian male dramatists and playwrights
University of Pécs alumni
21st-century Hungarian dramatists and playwrights
21st-century Hungarian male writers